German submarine U-111 was a Type IXB U-boat of Nazi Germany's Kriegsmarine during World War II.

She had a short career, sinking four enemy vessels and damaging one other. These victories took place over a period of two war patrols. During her first sortie, the boat sank two enemy vessels and damaged a further one. On her second patrol, U-111 sank two more enemy ships before she herself was sunk on 4 October 1941 southwest of Tenerife, by depth charges from a British warship. Out of a crew of 52 officers and men, eight died in the attack; 44 survived.

Construction and design

Construction

U-111 was ordered to be built by the Kriegsmarine on 8 August 1939 (as part of Plan Z and in violation of the Treaty of Versailles). Her keel was laid down on 20 February 1940 by DeSchiMAG AG Weser in Bremen as yard number 976. Following about seven months of construction, she was launched on 15 September and commissioned on 19 December under the command of Kapitänleutnant Wilhelm Kleinschmidt.

Design

German Type IXB submarines were slightly larger than the original German Type IX submarines, later designated IXA. U-111 had a displacement of  when at the surface and  while submerged. She had two shafts and two  propellers.

U-111 was fitted with six  torpedo tubes (four fitted at the bow and two at the stern), 22 torpedoes, one  SK C/32 naval gun, 180 rounds, and a  SK C/30 as well as a  C/30 anti-aircraft gun. The boat had a complement of forty-eight.

Service history

First patrol

U-111 went to sea on a war patrol for the first time on 5 May 1941. For a period of 64 days, she roamed the North Sea and eventually the North Atlantic as far west as Nova Scotia in search of any Allied convoys heading to Great Britain. During that time she encountered three enemy vessels. The first confrontation took place on the 13th, just eight days after leaving port, when she came across the British merchant vessel  and sank her just south of Iceland. On 20 May, whilst searching for the convoy HX-126, the submarine came across the tanker San Felix and fired a torpedo at her, causing damage to her hull but failing to sink her. Two days later, U-111 sank the second and last enemy vessel of her patrol, the Barnby, south of Greenland. After these victories, the boat stayed in the area to broadcast decoy signals. On 25 May, U-111 replenished from the supply ship Belchen and took fuel and food but no torpedoes. She entered the port of Lorient in occupied France on 7 July.

Second patrol and loss
U-111 left Lorient on 14 August 1941 and travelled south off the west coast of Africa and into the South Atlantic. She then turned west towards the eastern coast of Brazil. It was in these waters that the boat sank her last two enemy merchant ships. The first was the Dutch Motor merchant vessel Marken. She was torpedoed on 10 September just north of Ceará in Brazil. All of her crew survived the attack and boarded life boats. They were questioned by the crew of the U-boat, given food and released. Markens crew were later safely picked up by a Spanish merchant vessel. Ten days later, U-111 sank her fourth and last enemy vessel, the British motor merchant ship Cingalese Prince also off Brazil. She was struck by the British submarine  which had accidentally dived onto her after unsuccessfully attacking U–67. U-111 was so badly damaged she was left unable to dive, and was obliged to head for home.

Of a crew of 52 men, eight died and 44 survived. They were subsequently interrogated; it was the first time prisoners of war were captured from a U-boat operating in the South Atlantic.
According to the lengthy interrogation report, the crew of U-111 put up a poor fight and surrendered speedily to their much less powerful adversary after their Captain was killed. The crew consisted of four officers, three chief petty officers, fourteen petty officers, and thirty ratings, plus an officer under instruction as a prospective U-boat Captain. U-111s commander, Wilhelm Kleinschmidt, was killed in the action with Lady Shirley, along with her First Lieutenant, a junior officer, and five ratings. The captured POWs said that the normal complement was 43, including officers.

Wolfpacks
U-111 took part in one wolfpack, namely:
 West (13 May - 5 June 1941)

Summary of raiding history

References

Bibliography

External links

 U-111 versus HMS Lady Shirley (Spanish)

German Type IX submarines
U-boats commissioned in 1940
U-boats sunk in 1941
World War II submarines of Germany
1940 ships
World War II shipwrecks in the Atlantic Ocean
Ships built in Bremen (state)
U-boats sunk by British warships
U-boats sunk by depth charges
Maritime incidents in October 1941